Eucanippe is a genus of Western Australian armored trapdoor spiders first described by Michael Gordon Rix, Robert J. Raven, Barbara York Main, S. E. Harrison, A. D. Austin, S. J. B. Cooper & Mark Stephen Harvey in 2017.

Species
 it contains seven species:
Eucanippe absita Rix, Main, Raven & Harvey, 2018 — Australia (Western Australia)
Eucanippe agastachys Rix, Main, Raven & Harvey, 2018 — Australia (Western Australia)
Eucanippe bifida Rix, Main, Raven & Harvey, 2017 — Australia (Western Australia)
Eucanippe eucla Rix, Main, Raven & Harvey, 2018 — Australia (Western Australia)
Eucanippe mallee Rix, Main, Raven & Harvey, 2018 — Australia (Western Australia)
Eucanippe mouldsi Rix, Main, Raven & Harvey, 2018 — Australia (Western Australia)
Eucanippe nemestrina Rix, Main, Raven & Harvey, 2018 — Australia (Western Australia)

References

External links

Idiopidae
Mygalomorphae genera